Beirut Football Academy, or simply BFA, is a football academy based in Forn El Chebbak, a district in Beirut, Lebanon. Founded in 2004 as the first football academy in the country, they play their games at the Al Sharq Stadium.

History 
Beirut Football Academy (BFA) was founded in March 2004 as Lebanon's first football academy. It has five branches: Furn el Shebbek, Hazmieh, Ain Saadeh, Mansourieh and Batroun.

On 29 December 2019, BFA signed an agreement with Cypriot club AEK Larnaca, with the two clubs becoming affiliates.

Women's football

BFA's women's football club was founded in 2016, and compete in the Lebanese Women's Football League. They finished runners-up in the 2020–21 Lebanese Women's FA Cup, losing on penalty shoot-outs to EFP in the final.

Players

Managerial and technical staff

Honours
Lebanese Women's FA Cup
Runners-up (1): 2020–21

See also
 Lebanese Women's Football League
 Women's football in Lebanon
 List of women's association football clubs in Lebanon

References

 
Sports organisations of Lebanon
Youth sport in Lebanon
2004 establishments in Lebanon
Women's football clubs in Lebanon
Association football clubs established in 2016